Rising Sun is a motor yacht designed by Jon Bannenberg, and built in 2004 by Germany's Lürssen at their Bremen shipyard for Larry Ellison, CEO of Oracle Corporation, and last refitted in 2007. Rising Sun has been owned since 2010 by businessman David Geffen, who had bought a half share of the yacht initially in late 2006. 

A gym, a basketball court, a wine cellar and a movie theater are among the yacht's 82 rooms.

W magazine listed some of the guests on Geffen's yacht: Leonardo DiCaprio, Bruce Springsteen, Oprah Winfrey, Gayle King, Julia Roberts, Maria Shriver, Steven Spielberg, JJ Abrams, Martin Short, Diane Sawyer, Diane von Furstenberg, Karlie Kloss, Peter Harrington-Cressman, Jen Meyer, Josh Kushner, and Sir Paul McCartney.

Geffen and his crew of 45 self-isolated in the Grenadines on Rising Sun during the COVID-19 pandemic.

References

Motor yachts
Ships built in Bremen (state)
2004 ships
David Geffen
Larry Ellison